Tascott is a suburb of the Central Coast region of New South Wales, Australia between Gosford and Woy Woy on Brisbane Water's western shore. It is part of the  local government area.

History of Tascott
It was founded by Thomas Alison Scott and his wife Mary Anne Scott.The name of the suburb is derived from Scott's name, T.A.Scott. Scott is widely regarded as the first person in Australia to grow sugar cane, around 1835. Scott's field of sugar cane, said to be 20 acres in area, was still present, when recorded by a visitor to the area, in 1874.

The suburb contains Tascott railway station, which is on the Main North railway line. The station opened in 1905 and was built largely to service a guesthouse known as 'Waterview' that had been established by Mary Scott.

The station once had a particularly dangerous level crossing, between the platform and the curved cutting just to the north. Robert Scott, T.A.Scott's son and heir, was killed there by a train in 1920 and he was not the only fatality crossing the railway. For many years, this level crossing was the only means of road access to the area west of the railway station. The short platform at Tascott was also a cause of mishaps. The station was rebuilt in 1939, with the new timber deck platform being supported on a framework of old rails, instead of a timber frame. This new design was referred to as a ‘Tascott type’ platform, by railway engineers, and the same arrangement was used, at other stations, over the following 25 years. The station remains a 'short platform' of only two train cars in length.

A private road from Koolewong to Tascott was constructed in the late 1920s but a wooden bridge across the gully later collapsed and was not repaired. Access to both suburbs was greatly improved by the building of the 'waterfront road'—now Brisbane Water Drive—in the late 1930s.

For many years, the suburb was in four distinct parts; the area to the north of the station and west of the line, the area of waterfront adjacent to Point Clare, the area west of the station, and the area around Thomas Street. The dangerous level crossing at the station ceased to be used by cars some time in the 1960s. The level crossing near Thomas Street closed in 1963. Both crossings never had warning signals, just farm-style gates. For many years afterwards, pedestrians continued to cross the line at both these locations—including to access the Up platform at the station or catch the bus on Brisbane Water Drive—before the pedestrian overbridge was built at the station and the level crossing at the station was officially closed in 1984. The extension of Glenrock Parade, from the north of the station through to Koolewong, finally provided safe road access to the entire area of Tascott. Prior to late 1970, the section of the road—now part of Glenrock Parade—that intersected Thomas Street was known as Tascott Parade.

Before World War II, Tascott was a minor holiday destination and, until the 1960s, the suburb was semi-rural. The flat—formerly swampy—area to the west of the railway station was a dairy farm, known as Tascott Dairy, which survived into the early 1960s. During this period, Tascott had no sewerage or reticulated water supply. Subdivisions, land sales, and the building of many new houses, led to a rapid growth in the population, during the 1960s and 1970s.

The population of the suburb recorded at the 2016 census was 1,602; a decrease from the 1,706 recorded in 2011.

Notable residents
 Nicola McDermott, 2018 Commonwealth Games bronze medallist and 2020 Summer Olympics silver medallist in high jump

References

Suburbs of the Central Coast (New South Wales)